This is a list of animated television series scheduled to air in 2014.

See also
 List of animated feature films of 2014
 List of Japanese animation television series of 2014

References

Television series
Animated series
2014
2014
2014-related lists